Dublin County Council was a local authority for the administrative county of County Dublin in Ireland.

History
The county council was established by the Local Government (Ireland) Act 1898. Its headquarters were established at 10–11 Parnell Square in 1900 but, due to the cramped conditions, it transferred to 46–49 O'Connell Street, Dublin City in 1975.

In 1985, Dublin County was divided into three electoral counties: Dublin–Belgard (South Dublin from 1991) to the southwest, Dublin–Fingal (Fingal from 1991) to the north, and Dún Laoghaire–Rathdown to the southeast. At the 1985 local election and the 1991 local election, the election was held within these electoral counties.

On 1 January 1994, under the implementation of the Local Government (Dublin) Act 1993, Dublin County, the County Council and the Corporation of Dún Laoghaire were abolished, and the electoral counties each became administrative counties. Dublin County Council was succeeded by the councils of:
 Dún Laoghaire–Rathdown County Council
 Fingal County Council
 South Dublin County Council

Dublin City Council, styled Dublin Corporation until 2002, is separate from the other administrative counties and continues to administer the city of Dublin.

The archives of Dublin County Council are held at Fingal Local Studies & Archives.

Legacy
The Dublin Regional Authority is the statutory authority that currently has functions in the city and greater metropolitan area, these relate mainly to cooperation and coordination of agencies, the authorities membership is from the councils in the areas concerned. Both the Parnell Square property and the O'Connell Street property were transferred to the Fingal County Council on abolition of Dublin County Council. These offices were a key location in the events described in the Mahon Tribunal – a tribunal which inquired into re-zoning and planning irregularities in the 1980s in County Dublin.

Motto

External links
 Dublin Regional Authority
 Mahon Tribunal

References

Local government in County Dublin
History of County Dublin
Former local authorities in the Republic of Ireland